Naveen John (born 7 April 1986 in Salmiya) is an Indian racing cyclist, who currently rides for Indian team Karnataka.

Career
In 2014, John became India's national time trial champion, defeating Arvind Panwar by one second. The following year, he joined British team Kingsnorth International Wheelers.

In 2016, John joined Australian UCI Continental team State of Matter MAAP Racing, making him the first Indian to join an international professional cycling team. In February, John regained his title as time trial champion. Later that season, John, along with Arvind Panwar, became the first Indians to compete in the World Championships, when they both competed in the time trial. He finished in 55th position.

In 2017, John left the Australian team, joining the Belgian club Asfra Racing Oudenaarde. He defended his title as national time trial champion, and also won the road race championship.

In 2018, John returned to the Ciclo Racing Team, with whom he spent 3 seasons with from 2010 to 2012. In February, John competed in the Asian Road Championships, finishing 10th in the time trial, and 44th in the road race.

In April 2019, Naveen John took part in the Asian Road Cycling Championships. He was 36th in the Mass-start road race.

Major results

2012
 2nd Overall Tour of Nilgiris
2014
 1st  Time trial, National Road Championships
2016
 1st  Time trial, National Road Championships
2017
 National Road Championships
1st  Time trial
1st  Road race
 2nd Overall Tour of Nilgiris
1st Stages 4 & 5
2018
 1st Overall Tour of Nilgiris
1st Stages 3 & 5
 2nd Time trial, National Road Championships
 10th Time trial, Asian Road Championships
2019
 1st  Time trial, South Asian Games
 1st  Time trial, National Road Championships
2022
 8th Time trial, Asian Road Championships
2023
 1st  Time trial, National Road Championships

References

External links

1986 births
Living people
Indian male cyclists
Sportspeople from Kuwait City
Indian expatriates in Kuwait
South Asian Games gold medalists for India
South Asian Games medalists in cycling